The tournament in Asunción was a new addition to the ITF Women's Circuit.

Argentinian-duo Sofía Luini and Guadalupe Pérez Rojas won the title, defeating Anastasia Pivovarova and Patricia Maria Țig in the final, 6–3, 6–3.

Seeds

Draw

References 
 Draw

CIT Paraguay Open - Doubles